BentallGreenOak is a real estate investment firm based in Toronto and New York City. The firm is the real estate investment arm of Sun Life Financial. It is considered one of the largest real estate investment firms in North America.

In 2022, the firm was ranked by PERE (under Private Equity International) as the seventh largest Private Equity Real Estate firm based on total fundraising over the most recent five-year period.

Background 

Bentall Kennedy and GreenOak Real Estate merged to form BentallGreenOak in 2019.

Bentall Kennedy was a Canadian real estate investment firm that was a subsidiary of Sun Life Financial and GreenOak Real Estate was an American private equity real estate firm established in 2010 with its seed capital being provided by the Tetragon Financial Group.

In 2019, Sun Life Financial acquired a 56% stake in GreenOak Real Estate by paying $195 million in cash. Then Sun Life merged the two firms to form BentallGreenOak. Bentall Kennedy's CEO, Gary Whitelaw became CEO of the new entity.

In 2020, Whitelaw resigned from his position as CEO and was replaced by GreenOak Real Estate co-founders, Sonny Kalsi and John Carrafiell who are currently serving as Co-CEOs.

Investments 

 1250 René-Lévesque
 Cloverdale Mall.
 Eastgate Square
 Eglinton Square Shopping Centre
 KPMG Tower
 North Hill Centre
 Pen Centre
 Richardson Building
 Sun Life Centre
 St. Vital Centre
 The Tenor
 White Oaks Mall

Disputes 

East End Capital and a pair of Australian investors filed a lawsuit against BentallGreenOak after they pulled out from a deal to purchase a Miami office tower. The court ruled in favour of BentallGreenOak resulting in East End Capital's side being required to pay back a $5.5 million deposit.

References

External links
 

Financial services companies established in 2019
Investment companies of the United States
Investment companies of Canada
Real estate companies of the United States
Real estate companies of Canada
Sun Life Financial